Top Country Albums is a chart that ranks the top-performing country music albums in the United States, published by Billboard.  In 2003, 16 different albums topped the chart, based on electronic point of sale data provided by SoundScan Inc.

In the issue of Billboard dated January 4, Shania Twain was at number one with Up!, the album's fifth week in the top spot.  It spent two weeks atop the listing in 2003 before being displaced by Home  by the Dixie Chicks, which regained the peak position having first reached number one in 2002.  Home spent fourteen non-consecutive weeks at number one during 2003, making it the year's longest-running chart-topper and the all-female trio the act with the most weeks in the top spot during the year.  It was the group's third consecutive album to win the Grammy Award for Best Country Album.  The only act to have more than one chart-topping album in 2003 was Toby Keith, who engaged in a public feud with the Dixie Chicks in the early part of the year after the group's lead singer Natalie Maines made controversial comments about then-United States President George W. Bush, which led to many country music radio stations refusing to play their songs.  Keith topped the chart with both Unleashed and Shock'n Y'all, which was the final number one of the year.

Four acts topped the chart for the first time in 2003.  In April, Chris Cagle interrupted the Dixie Chicks' time at number one for a single week and gained his first chart-topper with his eponymous album.  In July, another self-titled album gave Buddy Jewell his first number one, two months after he won the first season of the TV singing contest Nashville Star.  In July, Trace Adkins reached the top of the chart for the first time with Greatest Hits Collection, Vol. 1, one of several greatest hits albums to reach number one during the year.  Two weeks later, Brad Paisley gained his first number one with Mud on the Tires; Paisley would go on to be one of the biggest new country stars of the early 21st century.  In contrast to the four first-time chart-toppers, George Strait gained his 18th number one with Honkytonkville, extending his record for the highest number of chart-toppers in the listing's history.

Chart history

References

2003
United States country albums